The Jamaican Athletics Championships is an annual outdoor track and field competition organised by the Jamaica Athletics Administrative Association, which serves as the national championship for the sport in Jamaica.

Men

100 metres

1983: Everard Samuels
1984: Ray Stewart
1985: ????
1986: Ray Stewart
1987: Ray Stewart
1988: Ray Stewart
1989: Ray Stewart
1990: John Mair
1991: Ray Stewart
1992: Ray Stewart
1993: Michael Green
1994: Michael Green
1995: Michael Green
1996: Michael Green
1997: Percy Spencer
1998: Garth Robinson
1999: Patrick Jarrett
2000: Lindel Frater
2001: Christopher Williams
2002: Dwight Thomas
2003: Asafa Powell
2004: Asafa Powell
2005: Asafa Powell
2006: Michael Frater
2007: Asafa Powell
2008: Usain Bolt
2009: Usain Bolt
2010: Oshane Bailey
2011: Asafa Powell
2012: Yohan Blake
2013: Usain Bolt
2014: Nickel Ashmeade
2015: Asafa Powell
2016: Yohan Blake
2017: Yohan Blake
2018: Tyquendo Tracey
2019: Yohan Blake
2020: ????
2021: Tyquendo Tracey

200 metres
1983: Leroy Reid
1984: Gus Young
1985: ????
1986: Leroy Reid
1987: Clive Wright
1988: Clive Wright
1989: Clive Wright
1990: ????
1991: Windell Dobson
1992: Clive Wright
1993: Ray Stewart
1994: Garth Robinson
1995: Percy Spencer
1996: Percy Spencer
1997: Percy Spencer
1998: Garth Robinson
1999: Christopher Williams
2000: Christopher Williams
2001: Christopher Williams
2002: Dwight Thomas
2003: Usain Bolt
2004: Steve Mullings
2005: Usain Bolt
2006: Asafa Powell
2007: Usain Bolt
2008: Usain Bolt
2009: Usain Bolt
2010: Asafa Powell
2011: Nickel Ashmeade
2012: Yohan Blake
2013: Warren Weir
2014: Rasheed Dwyer
2015: Nickel Ashmeade
2016: Yohan Blake
2017: Yohan Blake
2018: Jahnoy Thompson
2019: Rasheed Dwyer
2020: ????
2021: Rasheed Dwyer

400 metres
1983: Bert Cameron
1984: Bert Cameron
1985: ?
1986: Bert Cameron
1987: Bert Cameron
1988: Bert Cameron
1989: Howard Davis
1990: Howard Burnett
1991: Bert Cameron
1992: Anthony Wallace
1993: Dennis Blake
1994: Greg Haughton
1995: Greg Haughton
1996: Davian Clarke
1997: Roxbert Martin
1998: Roxbert Martin
1999: Greg Haughton
2000: Greg Haughton
2001: Michael McDonald
2002: Michael Blackwood
2003: Michael Blackwood
2004: Brandon Simpson
2005: Lansford Spence
2006: Ricardo Chambers

800 metres
1991: Delroy Hayden
1992: Clive Terrelonge
1993: Clive Terrelonge
1994: Mario Vernon-Watson
1995: Alex Morgan
1996: Alex Morgan
1997: Alex Morgan
1998: Alex Morgan
1999: Mario Vernon-Watson
2000: Marvin Watts
2001: Marvin Watts
2002: Marvin Watts
2003: Jermaine Myers
2004: Aldwyn Sappleton
2005: Aldwyn Sappleton
2006: Evan Allen

1500 metres
1991: Linton McKenzie
1992: Linton McKenzie
1993: Linton McKenzie
1994: Steve Green
1995: Cleon Spencer
1996: Oral Robertson
1997: Milton Sergeant
1998: Steve Green
1999: Steve Green
2000: Omar Fagan
2001: Courtney Chambers
2002: Michael Tomlin
2003: Mario Smith
2004: Shawn Pitter
2005: Alex Morgan
2006: Kerone Fairweather

5000 metres
1991: Linton McKenzie
1992: Jermaine Mitchell
1993: Norval Jones
1994: ?
1995: Linton McKenzie
1996: Jermaine Mitchell
1997: Linton McKenzie
1998: ?
1999: Michael Tomlin
2000: Kevin Campbell
2001: Michael Tomlin
2002: Michael Tomlin
2003: Andrew Gutzmore
2004: Lawrence Mendez
2005: Wainard Talbert
2006: Wainard Talbert

10,000 metres
1991: Mike Feurtado
1992: Kenneth Richards
1993: Oral Anderson
1994: ?
1995: ?
1996: Nils Antonio
1997: ?
1998: ?
1999: Hector Richards
2000: Kevin Webb
2001: Kevin Webb
2002: Kevin Webb
2003: Andrew Gutzmore
2004: Andrew Gutzmore
2005: Wainard Talbert
2006: Wainard Talbert

3000 metres steeplechase
1993: Preston Campbell

110 metres hurdles
1991: Richard Bucknor
1992: Richard Bucknor
1993: Andrew Parker
1994: Robert Foster
1995: Robert Foster
1996: Robert Foster
1997: Maurice Wignall
1998: Greg Hines
1999: Maurice Wignall
2000: Robert Foster
2001: Maurice Wignall
2002: Maurice Wignall
2003: Maurice Wignall
2004: Maurice Wignall
2005: Maurice Wignall
2006: Decosma Wright

400 metres hurdles
1991: Winthrop Graham
1992: Winthrop Graham
1993: Winthrop Graham
1994: Mitchell Francis
1995: Winthrop Graham
1996: Dinsdale Morgan
1997: Dinsdale Morgan
1998: Dinsdale Morgan
1999: Kemel Thompson
2000: Kemel Thompson
2001: Ian Weakley
2002: Kemel Thompson
2003: Danny McFarlane
2004: Danny McFarlane
2005: Kemel Thompson
2006: Danny McFarlane

High jump
1991: Dennis Fearon
1992: Ruel James
1993: Dennis Fearon
1994: Dennis Fearon
1995: Enrico Gordon
1996: Garfield Baker
1997: Enrico Gordon
1998: ?
1999: Craig Norman
2000: Germaine Mason
2001: Claston Bernard
2002: Germaine Mason
2003: Germaine Mason
2004: 
2005: Germaine Mason
2006: Not held

Pole vault
1991: ?
1992: Junior Collins
1993: Shawn Cousins
1994: Clinton Gordon
1995: ?
1996: ?
1997: ?
1998: ?
1999: Omar Gardiner
2000: Fenton McDuffus
2001: Jabari Ennis
2002: Joseph Dickens
2003: Jabari Ennis
2004: Jabari Ennis
2005: Dwayne Brown
2006: Not held

Long jump
1991: Ron Chambers
1992: Robert Foster
1993: Neil Gardner
1994: Ron Chambers
1995: James Beckford
1996: James Beckford
1997: James Beckford
1998: James Beckford
1999: Maurice Wignall
2000: James Beckford
2001: Antholow Dawkins
2002: James Beckford
2003: Aundre Edwards
2004: James Beckford
2005: James Beckford
2006: Herbert McGregor

Triple jump
1991: Jerome Douglas
1992: Ron Chambers
1993: Jerome Douglas
1994: Anthony Williams
1995: James Beckford
1996: Jerome Douglas
1997: Jerome Douglas
1998: ?
1999: Lancelot Gooden
2000: Nicholas Neufville
2001: Noel Comrie
2002: Noel Comrie
2003: Bernard Shirley
2004: Wilbert Walker
2005: Wilbert Walker
2006: Wilbert Walker

Shot put
1991: Robert Holdsworth
1992: Robert Holdsworth
1993: Howard Brown
1994: ?
1995: Dave Grant
1996: Arthur Compass
1997: Robert Holdsworth
1998: ?
1999: Kevin Brown
2000: Rory Marsh
2001: Maurice Smith
2002: Jason Morgan
2003: Dorian Scott
2004: Dorian Scott
2005: Dorian Scott
2006: Dorian Scott

Discus throw
1991: ?
1992: Oral Grant
1993: Howard Brown
1994: Linval Swaby
1995: Dave Grant
1996: Linval Swaby
1997: ?
1998: ?
1999: Kevin Brown
2000: Kevin Brown
2001: Maurice Smith
2002: Kevin Brown
2003: Claston Bernard
2004: Dwayne Henclewood
2005: Maurice Smith
2006: Not held

Hammer throw
1994: John Paul Clarke
2003: Richard Wright

Javelin throw
1991: ?
1992: Oral Grant
1993: Raymond Passley
1994: 
1995: Hubert Knight
1996: Raymond Passley
1997: Christopher Wilson
1998: ?
1999: Rudolph Currie
2000: Maurice Smith
2001: Kevin Bennett
2002: Not held
2003: Robert Barnes
2004: Robert Barnes
2005: Not held
2006: Miekael Downer

Decathlon
2002: Decosma Wright

Women

100 metres

1983: Leleith Hodges
1984: Grace Jackson
1985: ?
1986: Camille Coates
1987: Vivienne Spence
1988: Merlene Ottey
1989: Andria Lloyd
1990: Juliet Campbell
1991: Merlene Ottey
1992: Juliet Cuthbert
1993: Merlene Ottey
1994: Dahlia Duhaney
1995: Merlene Ottey
1996: Merlene Ottey
1997: Merlene Ottey
1998: Beverly McDonald
1999: Peta-Gaye Dowdie
2000: Peta-Gaye Dowdie
2001: Aleen Bailey
2002: Veronica Campbell Brown
2003: Aleen Bailey
2004: Veronica Campbell Brown
2005: Veronica Campbell Brown
2006: Sherone Simpson
2007: Veronica Campbell Brown
2008: Kerron Stewart
2009: Shelly-Ann Fraser-Pryce
2010: Sherone Simpson
2011: Veronica Campbell Brown
2012: Shelly-Ann Fraser-Pryce
2013: Kerron Stewart
2014: Veronica Campbell Brown
2015: Shelly-Ann Fraser-Pryce
2016: Elaine Thompson
2017: Elaine Thompson
2018: Elaine Thompson
2019: Elaine Thompson
2020: ????
2021: Shelly-Ann Fraser-Pryce

200 metres
1983: Juliet Cuthbert
1984: Grace Jackson
1985: ?
1986: Grace Jackson
1987: Vivienne Spence
1988: Grace Jackson
1989: Grace Jackson
1990: ?
1991: Grace Jackson
1992: Merlene Ottey
1993: Merlene Ottey
1994: Merlene Frazer
1995: Juliet Cuthbert
1996: Merlene Ottey
1997: Juliet Cuthbert
1998: Beverly McDonald
1999: Beverly McDonald
2000: Beverly McDonald
2001: Aleen Bailey
2002: Beverly McDonald
2003: Aleen Bailey
2004: Veronica Campbell Brown
2005: Veronica Campbell Brown
2006: Sherone Simpson

400 metres
1983: Cathy Rattray-Williams
1984: Cathy Rattray-Williams
1985: ?
1986: Ilrey Oliver
1987: Sandie Richards
1988: Sandie Richards
1989: Sandie Richards
1990: Juliet Campbell
1991: Sandie Richards
1992: Sandie Richards
1993: Juliet Campbell
1994: Sandie Richards
1995: Deon Hemmings
1996: Juliet Campbell
1997: Lorraine Fenton
1998: Sandie Richards
1999: Lorraine Fenton
2000: Lorraine Fenton
2001: Lorraine Fenton
2002: Lorraine Fenton
2003: Lorraine Fenton
2004: Nadia Davy
2005: Shericka Williams
2006: Novlene Williams-Mills

800 metres
1991: Inez Turner
1992: Inez Turner
1993: Michelle Ballentine
1994: Charmaine Howell
1995: Inez Turner
1996: Mardrea Hyman
1997: Inez Turner
1998: Mardrea Hyman
1999: Charmaine Howell
2000: Charmaine Howell
2001: Charmaine Howell
2002: Charmaine Howell
2003: Michelle Ballentine
2004: Michelle Ballentine
2005: Kenia Sinclair
2006: Kenia Sinclair

1500 metres
1991: Janice Turner
1992: Mardrea Hyman
1993: Janice Turner
1994: Janice Turner
1995: Yvonne Mai-Graham
1996: Mardrea Hyman
1997: Mardrea Hyman
1998: Mardrea Hyman
1999: ?
2000: Tanice Bennett
2001: Mardrea Hyman
2002: Mardrea Hyman
2003: Not held
2004: Mardrea Hyman
2005: Nicola Maye
2006: Kenia Sinclair

3000 metres
1991: Evette Turner
1992: Evette Turner
1993: Not held
1994: Not held
1995: Not held
1996: Not held
1997: Not held
1998: Not held
1999: Not held
2000: Not held
2001: Not held
2002: Anieta Martin
2003: Anieta Martin
2004: Not held
2005: Not held
2006: Not held

3000 metres steeplechase
2005: Mardrea Hyman

100 metres hurdles
1991: Michelle Freeman
1992: Michelle Freeman
1993: Michelle Freeman
1994: Michelle Freeman
1995: Gillian Russell
1996: Dionne Rose-Henley
1997: Michelle Freeman
1998: Dionne Rose-Henley
1999: Delloreen Ennis-London
2000: Delloreen Ennis-London
2001: Delloreen Ennis-London
2002: Brigitte Foster-Hylton
2003: Brigitte Foster-Hylton
2004: Delloreen Ennis-London
2005: Delloreen Ennis-London & Brigitte Foster-Hylton
2006: Brigitte Foster-Hylton

400 metres hurdles
1991: Deon Hemmings
1992: Deon Hemmings
1993: Deon Hemmings
1994: Deon Hemmings
1995: Deon Hemmings
1996: Deon Hemmings
1997: Deon Hemmings
1998: Deon Hemmings
1999: Deon Hemmings
2000: Deon Hemmings
2001: Debbie Parris-Thymes
2002: Debbie Parris-Thymes
2003: Allison Beckford
2004: Debbie Parris-Thymes
2005: Debbie Parris-Thymes
2006: Melaine Walker

High jump
1991: Diane Guthrie-Gresham
1992: Karen Beautle
1993: Karen Beautle
1994: Natalie Richardson
1995: Magon Moncrieffe
1996: Diane Guthrie-Gresham
1997: Karen Beautle
1998: Karen Beautle
1999: Karen Beautle
2000: Sheree Francis
2001: Maresa Cadienhead
2002: Karen Beautle
2003: Peaches Roach
2004: Karen Beautle
2005: Sheree Francis
2006: Karen Beautle

Pole vault
2000: Maria Newton
2001: Sande Swaby

Long jump
1991: Diane Guthrie-Gresham
1992: Diane Guthrie-Gresham
1993: Dionne Rose-Henley
1994: Lacena Golding-Clarke
1995: Dionne Rose-Henley
1996: Lacena Golding-Clarke
1997: Lacena Golding-Clarke
1998: Lacena Golding-Clarke
1999: Lacena Golding-Clarke
2000: Elva Goulborne
2001: Elva Goulborne
2002: Elva Goulborne
2003: Elva Goulborne
2004: Elva Goulborne
2005: Elva Goulborne
2006: Nolle Graham

Triple jump
1991: Dione Sommerville
1992: Dione Sommerville
1993: Suzette Lee
1994: Suzette Lee
1995: Icolyn Kelly
1996: Suzette Lee
1997: Suzette Lee
1998: Suzette Lee
1999: Suzette Lee
2000: Keisha Spencer
2001: Trecia-Kaye Smith
2002: Trecia-Kaye Smith
2003: Suzette Lee
2004: Trecia-Kaye Smith
2005: Trecia-Kaye Smith
2006: Andrea Linton

Shot put
1991: Olivia McKoy
1992: Diane Guthrie-Gresham
1993: Cecilia Clarke
1994: ?
1995: Lesa-Gaye Francis
1996: Lesa-Gaye Francis
1997: ?
1998: ?
1999: Olivia McKoy
2000: Melissa Gibbons
2001: Not held
2002: Melissa Gibbons
2003: Kimberly Barrett
2004: Kimberly Barrett
2005: Kimberly Barrett
2006: Zara Northover

Discus throw
1991: Jacinth Smith
1992: Maxine McKenzie
1993: Cecilia Clarke
1994: Grettel Miller
1995: Tumara Dayes
1996: Melonie Burke
1997: ?
1998: ?
1999: Natalia Brown
2000: Melissa Gibbons
2001: Angella Mitchell
2002: Melissa Gibbons
2003: Kesheila Reid
2004: Kesheila Reid
2005: Kesheila Reid
2006: Phelecia Reynolds

Hammer throw
2002: Natalie Grant
2003: Natalie Grant
2004: Natalie Grant
2005: Natalie Grant
2006: Natalie Grant

Javelin throw
1991: Erica Donaldson
1992: Olivia McKoy
1993: Olivia McKoy
1994: 
1995: Diane Guthrie-Gresham
1996: Diane Guthrie-Gresham
1997: Olivia McKoy
1998: Olivia McKoy
1999: Olivia McKoy
2000: Olivia McKoy
2001: Brenda-Grace Hunt
2002: Kateema Riettie
2003: Kateema Riettie
2004: Olivia McKoy
2005: Olivia McKoy
2006: Olivia McKoy
2007 Olivia McKoy
.2008 Olivia McKoy
2009
2010
2011 Olivia McKoy
2012

Heptathlon
1991: Maria Brown
1999: Neisha Thompson
2000: Neisha Thompson

References

Champions 1983–2006
Jamaican Championships. GBR Athletics. Retrieved 2021-04-25.

Winners
 List
Jamaican Championships
Athletics